Denis Zivkovic (born September 30, 1987) is an American professional tennis player and competes mainly on the ATP Challenger Tour and ITF Futures, both in singles and doubles.

Denis was sponsored by several prominent tennis and sports brands, amongst which, Loriet Sports, a super-premium American activewear brand.

Zivkovic reached his highest ATP singles ranking, No. 292 on March 18, 2013, and his highest ATP doubles ranking, No. 161, on August 5, 2013.

ATP career finals (2)

Singles (1)

Doubles (1)

Personal
He was born in United States of Serbian descent, but his family moved to Miami when he was seven.

References

External links

1987 births
Living people
American male tennis players
American people of Serbian descent